Luke David Gambin (born 16 March 1993) is a professional footballer who plays as a winger for EFL League Two club Sutton United. Born in England, he represents the Malta national team.

Career

Barnet
Born in Sutton, London, Gambin began his career in the youth system at AFC Wimbledon before moving to Barnet as an apprentice in 2009. He made his first-team debut in a 4–0 win at home to former club AFC Wimbledon on 28 April 2012, coming on as a late substitute for Scott McGleish, before signing his first professional contract in the summer of 2012. Gambin made his first appearance of 2012–13 after being introduced as a 66th-minute substitute in a 3–0 defeat away to Bradford City on 15 September 2012. He found first-team opportunities limited, joining Isthmian League Premier Division club Hendon on loan in November 2012 and debuted as a substitute in a 2–1 defeat away to Aldershot Town in the FA Cup first round. He completed the loan spell with three appearances. Gambin broke into the Barnet first-team towards the end of the season and scored his first goal for the club in a 4–1 win at home to Morecambe on 9 March 2013. He finished the season with two goals from 10 appearances, but was unable to help Barnet prevent relegation to the Conference Premier.

Gambin signed a new long-term contract with Barnet a little more than a week before the start of 2013–14. He scored Barnet's first goal in a 3–0 win at home to Chester on the opening day of the season and finished 2013–14 with one goal from 25 appearances. Gambin scored four goals in 26 league appearances for Barnet in 2014–15 as the club won the Conference Premier title and therefore promotion to League Two. After the end of the season, Barnet took up the option to extend Gambin's contract. In Barnet's first season back in the Football League, Gambin scored four goals in 49 appearances, as they finished 15th in League Two.

He made his first appearance of 2016–17 in the starting lineup away to Cambridge United on the opening day of the season, which finished as a 1–1 draw. Barnet accepted a bid in excess of £100,000 from Leyton Orient for Gambin in August 2016, but he rejected the opportunity and instead stayed with the club. His first goal of the season came on 8 October 2016 against Doncaster Rovers, when he scored a late equaliser in the 86th minute to make the score 2–2, although Barnet went on to lose 3–2. After four goals from 21 appearances, Gambin was transfer listed after he rejected an offer of a new contract for the fourth time.

Luton Town
Gambin signed for League Two club Luton Town on 16 January 2017 on a two-and-a-half-year contract for an undisclosed fee, with the option of a further year. He made his debut five days later, starting in Luton's 1–1 draw away to Wycombe Wanderers. Gambin scored his first goal for Luton with the second goal in a 3–0 victory at home to Hartlepool United on 14 February. He was an unused substitute in both legs of their 6–5 aggregate play-off semi-final defeat to Blackpool, and finished 2016–17 with 17 appearances and one goal.

He joined League Two club Crawley Town on 31 August 2018 on loan until the end of 2018–19. Gambin was released by Luton when his contract expired at the end of the 2018–19 season.

Colchester United
Gambin signed for League Two club Colchester United on 26 June 2019 on a two-year contract, effective from 1 July. He made his club debut as a substitute for Jevani Brown in Colchester's 1–1 home draw with Port Vale on 3 August. He scored his first goal for the club on 29 October 2019 in Colchester's 3–1 EFL Cup victory against his former club Crawley Town.

He joined Colchester's divisional rivals Newport County on 20 January 2021 on loan until the end of the season. His debut came three days later in a 3–2 away defeat to Oldham Athletic, in which he scored Newport's second goal.

Ħamrun Spartans
Gambin signed for Ħamrun Spartans in July 2021.

Sutton United
On 16 July 2022, Gambin returned to England to join League Two club Sutton United having already featured in friendlies across pre-season.

International career
Gambin is of Maltese descent and joined the Malta squad for training in June 2015. His application for Maltese citizenship was successful and he was called up to the national team in May 2016. He debuted later that week, starting in a 6–0 friendly defeat to the Czech Republic. Gambin scored his first international goal in a 2–2 draw with Slovakia in a 2022 FIFA World Cup qualification match on 27 March 2021.

Career statistics

Club

International

As of match played 30 March 2021. Malta score listed first, score column indicates score after each Gambin goal.

Honours
Barnet
Conference Premier: 2014–15

Luton Town
EFL League Two runner-up: 2017–18

References

1993 births
Living people
Footballers from Sutton, London
English footballers
People with acquired Maltese citizenship
Maltese footballers
Malta international footballers
Association football midfielders
Barnet F.C. players
Hemel Hempstead Town F.C. players
Hendon F.C. players
Luton Town F.C. players
Crawley Town F.C. players
Colchester United F.C. players
Newport County A.F.C. players
Ħamrun Spartans F.C. players
Sutton United F.C. players
Isthmian League players
Southern Football League players
English Football League players
National League (English football) players
Maltese Premier League players
English people of Maltese descent